A clastic dike is a seam of sedimentary material that fills an open fracture in and cuts across sedimentary rock strata or layering in other rock types. Clastic dikes form rapidly by fluidized injection (mobilization of pressurized pore fluids) or passively by water, wind, and gravity (sediment swept into open cracks). Diagenesis may play a role in the formation of some dikes. Clastic dikes are commonly vertical or near-vertical. Centimeter-scale widths are common, but thicknesses range from millimetres to metres. Length is usually many times width.

Clastic dikes are found in sedimentary basin deposits worldwide. Formal geologic reports of clastic dikes began to emerge in the early 19th century.

Terms synonymous with clastic dike include: clastic intrusion, sandstone dike, fissure fill, soft-sediment deformation, fluid escape structure, seismite, injectite, liquefaction feature, neptunian dike (passive fissure fills), paleoseismic indicator, pseudo ice wedge cast, sedimentary insertion, sheeted clastic dike, synsedimentary filling, tension fracture, hydraulic injection dike, and tempestite.

Environments of formation
Clastic dike environments include:
 Clastic dikes associated with earthquakes – 
A large variety of dikes are found in the geologic record. However, clastic dikes are typically produced by seismic disturbance and liquefaction of high water content sediments. Examples of this type are many.  Clastic dikes are paleoseismic indicators in certain geologic settings.  Several qualitative, field-based systems have been developed to help distinguish seismites from soft sediment deformation features  formed by non-seismic processes.

Results from analytical modeling of clastic dike injection in soft rocks indicate propagation occurred at a rate of approximately 4 to 65 m/s at driving pressures of 1–2 MPa. Emplacement duration (<2 s) is similar to the speed with which acoustic energy (pressure waves) moves through partially lithified sedimentary rock.

 Clastic dikes associated with debris flows -

Sandstone dikes formed by downward injection are found along Black Dragon wash upstream of the famous petroglyphs area, San Rafael Swell, Utah.

 Clastic dikes associated with impact craters –

Sandstone dikes with cataclastically deformed sand grains, sourced in the Permian White Rim Sandstone, are found within Upheaval Dome, Canyonlands National Park, Utah, at Roberts Rift, and elsewhere. Commonly, the fill is composed of angular grains, evidence that the injected material was lithified prior to impact and was crushed during injection into fractures (preexisting or impact-formed).

 Clastic dikes associated with salt domes –
Clastic dike swarms associated with salt dome diapirism are reported from the Dead Sea region.

 Clastic dikes associated with glaciers –
Sand injection features are reported to have formed under heavy loads and confining pressures beneath grounding glacial ice.

 Clastic dikes in resistant bedrock –
Though unusual, a significant number of reports describe sedimentary material intruding fractured crystalline bedrock, usually within fault zones. Some of the articles referenced here describe lithified clastic dikes.

 Clastic dikes in storm deposits –
Cyclic stresses from large waves can cause wet sediments to fluidize, forming various types of soft sediment deformation features including clastic dikes.

Clastic dikes in the Columbia Basin

Tens of thousands of unusual clastic dikes (1 mm—350 cm wide, up to 50 m deep) penetrate sedimentary and bedrock units in the Columbia Basin of Washington, Oregon and Idaho. Their origin remains in question. The dikes may be related to loading by outburst floods. Other evidence suggests they are sediment-filled desiccation cracks (mudcracks). Some have suggested the dikes are ice wedge casts or features related to the melting of buried ice. Earthquake shaking and liquefaction is invoked by others to explain the dikes (i.e., sand blows).

The silt-, sand-, and gravel-filled dikes in the Columbia Basin are primarily sourced in the Touchet Formation (or the Touchet-equivalent Willamette Silt) and intrude downward into older geologic units, including:
 Pleistocene hillslope colluvium with developed caliche horizons in the Umatilla Basin near Alderdale, Washington
 Pleistocene landslide deposits along Hwy 14 in the Columbia Gorge (Umatilla Basin)
 Pleistocene Clearwater Gravels in the Lewiston Basin
 "Pre-late Wisconsin" outburst flood and flood-related deposits (includes the "ancient cataclysmic flood deposits" of Allen et al., 2009) in the Walla Walla Valley/Pasco Basin and Columbia Gorge
 Post-basalt basin fill sediments (Dalles Group, etc.) exposed in tributary stream valleys downstream of Wallula Gap
 Miocene-Pliocene Snipes Mountain Conglomerate in the Yakima Valley at Granger, Washington
 Miocene-Pliocene Ringold Formation in the Pasco Basin
 Miocene-Pliocene Ellensburg Formation at Craig's Hill near Ellensburg, Washington (outside Missoula flood track)
 Miocene-Pliocene Ellensburg Formation at Foster Coulee (WDFW Foster Ck Wildlife Area) near Bridgeport, Washington
 Miocene Columbia River Basalt (CRB) in the Walla Walla Valley and Pasco Basin at Gable Mountain
 Latah Formation (interbeds in CRBs) west of Finley, Washington along Hwy 397 and elsewhere

In 1925, Olaf P. Jenkins described the clastic dikes of eastern Washington state as follows:

See also

 Dike (geology)
 Dike swarm
 Igneous intrusion#Dikes
 Sheeted dyke complex

References

External links
 Sandstone dikes photo gallery

Sedimentary rocks
Dikes (geology)